Hadzhi Dimitar Peak is the mostly ice-covered peak of elevation 2088 m in the west foothills of Avery Plateau on Loubet Coast in Graham Land, Antarctica. It has steep and partly ice-free west and east slopes, and surmounts Hopkins Glacier to the west and north, and a tributary to that glacier to the southwest.

The peak is named after Hadzhi Dimitar (Dimitar Asenov, 1840–1868), a leader of the Bulgarian liberation movement, in connection with the settlement of Hadzhi Dimitar in Northeastern Bulgaria.

Location
British mapping in 1976.

Maps
 Antarctic Digital Database (ADD). Scale 1:250000 topographic map of Antarctica. Scientific Committee on Antarctic Research (SCAR). Since 1993, regularly upgraded and updated.
British Antarctic Territory. Scale 1:200000 topographic map. DOS 610 Series, Sheet W 66 64. Directorate of Overseas Surveys, Tolworth, UK, 1976.

Notes

References
 Bulgarian Antarctic Gazetteer. Antarctic Place-names Commission. (details in Bulgarian, basic data in English)
 Hadzhi Dimitar Peak. SCAR Composite Antarctic Gazetteer

External links
 Hadzhi Dimitar Peak. Copernix satellite image

Mountains of Graham Land
Bulgaria and the Antarctic
Loubet Coast